The Empire was an American automobile manufactured from 1901 until 1902.  A product of Sterling, Illinois, it featured a vee-twin Steam engine geared to its right-hand rear wheel. It had a rectangular, transverse mounted boiler with horizontal tubes across the chassis. Coachwork was of the motor buggy style.

Built by the Empire Manufacturing Co. (soon to be renamed the Empire Automobile Co.) in Sterling, Illinois, it was offered for only $750; the popular Oldsmobile Curved Dash cost $650.

The essentially same car was built 1901-1902 by the Sterling Automobile & Engine Co. When this company failed to pay their factory mortgage the company was sold by the sheriff's office for $1,300 and manufacture halted.

References
David Burgess Wise, The New Illustrated Encyclopedia of Automobiles.

Defunct motor vehicle manufacturers of the United States
Steam cars
Motor vehicle manufacturers based in Illinois